A Conspiracy of Paper is a historical-mystery novel by David Liss, set in London in the period leading up to the bursting of the South Sea Bubble in 1720.

Synopsis
The novel's story is told in the form of a first-person memoir penned by Benjamin Weaver (born Lienzo), London-born son of Portuguese Sephardic Jewish parents. After a successful career in bare-knuckle boxing, Weaver has found a new calling as a 'thief-taker'—roughly equivalent to a modern private investigator. Believing that his estranged father died in a tragic accident, Weaver is shocked when a prospective client claims that the 'accident' was, in fact, murder. Weaver's subsequent investigation involves him in the new London financial world of banks, stocks, speculation, violence and scandal leading up to the world's first stock-market crash, the South Sea Bubble. In order to solve the mystery, he must learn the inner workings of this new world of paper money. The murder investigation moves toward its conclusion in lock-step with the accelerating frenzy of the Bubble's final days.

A sub-plot involves Benjamin's gradual reintegration, after years of estrangement, into his family's community and traditions. This gives the author the opportunity to introduce the Lienzo family, and their struggles to survive and prosper as Jews and foreigners in 18th century London. Benjamin finds added incentive to rejoin his family when he meets the beautiful Miriam, widow of his cousin and now living in his uncle Miguel's household.

Eventually, Weaver goes back to live in the Jewish area of Dukes Place, regularly attends Sabbath prayers at the Synagogue and strictly refrains from consuming pork. As referenced in David Liss' extensive personal note at the end of the book, this parallels the author's own personal development - raised as a completely secular Jew in the present-day US and deciding as an adult to keep some of the observances of Judaism.

Real world ties
Though the Lienzo family and other main characters are fictional, the story is well-researched, and includes historical events surrounding the South Sea Bubble. The early days of the London Stock Exchange in the coffee houses of Exchange Alley are colorfully depicted, and Weaver has to deal with historical characters such as Jonathan Wild, the notorious 'Thief-taker General'.  In the 'Historical Note' following the novel, regarding the Benjamin Weaver character, Liss states that "I found inspiration for his character in the story of Daniel Mendoza", a real-life boxing champion.

Explanation of the novel's title
The title alludes to the South Sea Company's fraudulent schemes to inflate and maintain the value of its stock.

Awards and nominations
 Best First Mystery Novel 2001. Macavity Awards
 Best First Novel 2001. Edgar Awards

References

External links
 Author's website  (accessed Aug, 2010)
 Publisher's David Liss page  (accessed Aug, 2010)
 Follow the Phony Money. NY Times book review, February 20, 2000.  (accessed Aug, 2010)
 A Conspiracy of Paper by David Liss. Salon.com, March 7, 2000.  (accessed Aug, 2010)

2000 American novels
American historical novels
American mystery novels
Novels by David Liss
Novels set in London
Novels set in the 1710s
Macavity Award-winning works
Barry Award-winning works
South Sea Bubble
Historical mystery novels